Gamini is a Maldivian period drama web television series developed for Baiskoafu by Moomin Fuad. Produced by Mohamed Zuhuree under Final Chapter Studio, the series stars Ismail Rasheed, Ahmed Asim, Ahmed Saeed, Mariyam Shakeela and Ismail Zahir in pivotal roles. Shooting for the series took place in Th. Kinbidhoo, Th. Veymandoo, Aa. Madoogali, Aa. Mathiveri, Aa. Feridhoo and F. Nilandhoo.

Cast and characters
 Yoosuf Rafeeu as Mohammaidhee
 Ismail Rasheed as MP Ali Thoha
 Mariyam Shakeela as Sobeeha
 Ahmed Asim as Mohamed Siraj
 Ali Fizam as Mausoom
 Washiya Mohamed
 Susan Ibrahim Fulhu as Dhaleykaiydhee
 Aminath Nisha Rasheed as Sana
 Nathasha Jaleel as Habeeba
 Mariyam Shifa as Lubna's friend
 Mohamed Imran
 Ameen Shafeeu
 Ismail Zahir as Hassan Iqbal
 Ajunaz Ali
 Ismail Waheed as Bob 
 Juza Jaufar
 Ahmed Saeed as Ageel
 Abdulla Naseer as Saleem

Episodes

Release and reception
The project was announced in January 2020 by releasing a teaser trailer which was positively received by the critics for its effective transition in timeline from 1980s to present. The first two episodes from the thirteen episodes series was streamed on 25 September 2020.

Upon release, the series received widespread positive reviews from critics. Gufthag Ajeez from Times called the series an "international Netflix standard" project where "each department from production, direction, cinematography, editing, back music to acting has outdone each and every prior releases in the industry". Azhan Ibrahim reviewing from Hama praised the direction and screenplay for mingling three decades in a sequential manner and called the film "a revolutionary series to the industry". Ifraz Ali from Dho? ranked the series in the second position from the list of year's best projects while particularly praising the cinematography for capturing the three decades in its most "authentic" way. "Apart from some dialogues and the length of each episode, the series does not falter in any department".

References

Serial drama television series
Maldivian television shows
Maldivian web series